The Shallow Lake Crushers are a senior hockey team based out of Shallow Lake, Ontario, Canada. Their inaugural season started in October 2007.

History

2007-08 Crushers Season
The Crushers would play their first ever game at home, losing to the Ripley Wolves by a score of 11-1.  Shallow Lake would continue to struggle, as they would lose their first twelve games, being outscored 103-30 in the process, before defeating the Georgian Bay River Rats by a score of 6-1 in their thirteenth game and earn their first ever victory.  Shallow Lake would play better hockey as the season went on, highlighted by a 6-4 win on the road over the Ripley Wolves.  The Crushers finished their expansion season with a 3-22-1 record, finishing in last place in the North Division.

The club would face the Drayton Icemen in a best of three qualifying series, with the winner advancing to the WOAA "A" playoffs.  Shallow Lake would take a lead in the third period during the 1st game of the series, before the Icemen mounted a comeback and took the game 5-4.  The Crushers rebounded in game two, holding off Drayton and even up the series with a solid 4-2 victory.  Game three would be another close game between the two clubs, as it was tied 4-4 after three periods of play.  Drayton would then score a goal in the extra period, ending the Crushers inaugural season in the league.

2008-09 Crushers Season
The Crushers would start the regular season on the right foot, surprising the Lucknow Lancers in the first game of the season with an 8-7 victory.  After that, wins would be few and far between, as Shallow Lake finished the year with a 3-16-1 record, earning seven points, and tenth place in the WOAA North Division.

Shallow Lake would face the Walkerton Capitals in the "B" semi-finals.  The Crushers would win their first ever playoff series on February 27 in game six at home, defeating Walkerton 5-3 and winning the series four games to two.  The win advanced them to the "B" final against the Milverton Four Wheel Drives.

After dropping game one at home 7-3, the Crushers would rally in game two in Milverton, and come out on top with a 7-6 overtime win.  Milverton would take the next two games to go up three games to one heading home for game five.  Shallow lake would surprise Milverton once again and defeat them 2-1 in Milverton to force a game six in Shallow Lake.  Shallow Lake would lead the game 1-0 going into the second but Milverton would come back to lead 3-2 at the end of the period.  Milverton would get the bounces in the third period and fire the final goal into an empty net for a 6-3 final score and the championship.

2009-10 Crushers Season
After two very poor regular seasons, in which the Crushers won three games in each of those seasons, Shallow Lake saw some improvement, as the team won a club record seven games, earning 15 points, and eighth place in the WOAA North Division standings, as the team made the "AA" playoffs for the first time in team history.

The playoffs would open with a best of five series against the first place, and unbeaten, Elora Rocks.  The Rocks would have no problem defeating the Crushers, as Elora swept the series in three games, winning by scores of 7-1, 7-2, and 4-1, to send the Crushers to the "A" playoff bracket.

The Crushers would face off against the Durham Thundercats in the "A" quarter-finals.  Durham would take the series opener by a 4-1 score, however, Shallow Lake rebounded in the second game, and easily defeated the Thundercats 8-1 to even the series up.  In the third game, the Crushers surprised the Thundercats once again, as they defeated Durham 8-5 to take a 2-1 lead.  Shallow Lake would stay hot in the fourth game, as they push the Thundercats to the brink of elimination with a 4-1 win to take a 3-1 series lead.  The fifth game would go into overtime, and Durham scored in the extra period to keep their playoff hopes alive.  In the sixth game, the Thundercats easily defeated the Crushers 7-3 to force a seventh and deciding game in Durham.  Shallow Lake took an early 1-0 lead in the last game, however, the Thundercats responded by scoring three goals before the end of the first period to take a 3-1 lead.  Durham added a goal in the second period to take a 4-1 going into the third, but the Crushers scored two quick goals in the middle of the period to cut the Thundercats lead to 4-3.  That would be as close as Shallow Lake could get, as Durham held them off to win the game, and the series, 4-3, eliminating Shallow Lake from the playoffs.

2010-11 Crushers season
Shallow Lake once again would improve, as the team won a team record ten games, finishing with 22 points, and a second straight eighth place finish in the North Division.

Season-by-Season record
Note: GP = Games played, W = Wins, L = Losses, T= Tie, OTL = Overtime Losses, Pts = Points, GF = Goals for, GA = Goals against

Related links
Shallow Lake, Ontario
Western Ontario Athletic Association
WOAA Senior Hockey League

External links
Shallow Lake Crushers Website
WOAA Website
WOAA Senior Hockey Website

Senior ice hockey teams
Ice hockey teams in Ontario